The Golden Joystick Awards, also known as the People's Gaming Awards, is a video game award ceremony; it awards the best video games of the year, as voted for originally by the British general public, but is now a global event that can be voted online via GamesRadar+. , the ceremony was in its 39th year. It is the longest-running video game award ceremony, launched in 1983, and the second-oldest video game award ceremony after the Arcade Awards, launched in 1981.

The awards were initially focused on PC games, but were later extended to include console games as well, owing to the success of video game consoles such as the Sega Master System and the Sega Mega Drive in the United Kingdom. The ceremony is not directly related to the golden joystick prize given away to successful contestants on GamesMaster, a British television show, but both properties belong to Future plc.

In 2021, the Golden Joystick Awards celebrated 50 Years Of Games by asking the public to vote for the Ultimate Game Of All Time, which was won by the 2011 game Dark Souls. The PC also received the Best Gaming Hardware of All Time Award, which was accepted by Valve president Gabe Newell.

Winners

1983
Awards were presented by DJ Dave Lee Travis at a ceremony in London's Berkeley Square.

1984
Awards were presented by Jools Holland, at a ceremony on in London.

1985
Awards were presented by Jools Holland, at a ceremony on a Thames Riverboat.

1986
The ceremony took place at Cadogan Hall.

1987
Awards were presented by Chris Tarrant.

1988
The ceremony took place at Kensington Roof Gardens.

1989

The ceremony took place at Kensington Roof Gardens, 11 April 1990.

1990
The ceremony took place at Kensington Roof Gardens, 4 April 1991.

1991
The ceremony took place at Hyde Park Hotel, London, on 7 April 1992.

1992
The ceremony took place at Kensington, London, in May 1993.

1994
The ceremony took place in London, on 16 May 1994.

1996/1997
The ceremony took place at Café de Paris, in November 1997.

2002
The 2002 ceremony took place at the Dorchester Hotel on 25 October 2002 and was hosted by Jonathan Ross (best known for presenting Friday Night with Jonathan Ross and Japanorama).

2003
The 2003 ceremony took place at the Park Lane Hilton on 28 November 2003 and was hosted by Phill Jupitus.

2004
The 2004 ceremony took place at the Park Lane Hilton on 5 November 2004 and was hosted by Matt Lucas.

2005
The 2005 ceremony took place at the Park Lane Hilton on 4 November 2005 and was hosted by Jimmy Carr.

2006
The 2006 ceremony took place at the Park Lane Hilton on 27 October 2006 and was hosted by Emma Griffiths.

2007
The 2007 ceremony took place at the Park Lane Hilton on 26 October 2007 and was hosted by David Mitchell.

2008
The 2008 ceremony took place at the Park Lane Hilton on 31 October 2008 and was hosted by Frankie Boyle.

2009
The 2009 ceremony took place at the Park Lane Hilton on 30 October 2009 and was hosted by Sean Lock.

2010
The 2010 ceremony took place at the Bridge Park Plaza on 29 October 2010 and was hosted by Rich Hall.

2011
The 2011 ceremony took place at the Bridge Park Plaza on 21 October 2011 and was hosted by Seann Walsh.

2012
The 2012 ceremony took place at the Bridge Park Plaza on 26 October 2012 and was hosted by Ed Byrne.

2013
The 2013 ceremony took place at the indigO2 on 25 October 2013 and was hosted by Ed Byrne.

2014
The 2014 ceremony took place at the indigO2 on 24 October 2014 and was hosted by Ed Byrne.

2015
The 2015 ceremony took place at the indigO2 on 30 October 2015 and was hosted by Danny Wallace.

2016
The 2016 ceremony took place at the indigO2 on 18 November 2016 and was hosted by James Veitch.

2017
The 2017 ceremony took place at Bloomsbury Big Top on 17 November 2017 and was hosted by Danny Wallace.

2018
The 2018 ceremony took place at Bloomsbury Big Top on 16 November 2018, and was hosted by Danny Wallace.

2019 
The 2019 ceremony took place at Bloomsbury Big Top on 16 November 2019.

2020 
The 2020 ceremony took place digitally on 24 November 2020 and was hosted by Laura Bailey and Travis Willingham.

2021 
The 2021 ceremony took place on 23 November 2021 and was hosted by Nolan North and Emily Rose.

2022 
The 2022 ceremony took place on 22 November 2022.

References

External links

 

1983 establishments in the United Kingdom
Awards established in 1983
British science and technology awards
 
Video game awards
Video game events
Video gaming in the United Kingdom